The Saint Lucia oriole (Icterus laudabilis) is a species of bird, in the family Icteridae and genus Icterus (or American Orioles). It is endemic to Saint Lucia.

Habitat 
St. Lucia orioles are known to inhabit mountain rainforests, dry coastal scrub forests, primary and secondary forests, the edges of certain plantations (such as banana citrus and coconut) and mangroves (particularly those that adjoin coastal scrub). They appear to be prefer humid mountain forests over the dry coastal scrub forests. The regions which are inhabited by St. Lucia orioles range from sea level up to 700m in elevation.

Geographic range 
St. Lucia orioles are endemic to, and exclusively found on the main island of St. Lucia. They are the only resident orioles on the island, however, Baltimore and Orchard orioles may be found in the region as vagrants.

Physical description 
These birds are identified as slim, long billed and largely black with flashes of russet orange on the shoulders, rump, belly and vent. The upper ridge of the beak, or culmen, is straight. The adult females are morphologically similar to males but with slightly paler orange patches. Immature orioles, in comparison to their mature counterparts, are mostly chestnut colored and have a golden-olive where the mature orioles are orange.

This particular species is roughly 20 to 22 cm in head to body length with an average mass of 36.9 gram (both male and female measurements are included). Males and females have average wingspans of 98.7mm and 94.0mm, respectively.

Behavior 
Typical of the Icterid family, St. Lucia orioles exhibit wide range of foraging adaptations. They feed on both fruits and insects. St. Lucia orioles have been observed stripping bark while foraging, in the manner of the Jamaican Oriole.

They produce a typical hanging oriole nest, which is basket shaped, and woven from plant fibers. The St. Lucia oriole nests under large fronds of banana plants and in coconut palms. Females lay 2-3 eggs at a time. Males do not feed the female during nesting, but they may aid in provisioning the young. Nesting occurs through April to early June.

Song 
The song of the St. Lucia orioles is a series, composed of two second long varied whistles played in a sequence. It is not known whether the species produces different series with unique variations of whistles or merely repeats the same sequence each time. The song is comparable to that of the Orchard Oriole, with one distinction being that it is weaker.

There are also two distinct calls of the St. Lucia orioles. These are a harsh chwee and a soft chup.

Conservation 
Recently, there has been a decline in both the population size and distribution, as the St. Lucia orioles have become more scarce and localized. They are currently classified as Endangered on the IUCN Red List with a population estimated at over 1,000 adults (although not drastically over). There are many factors that may pose a threat to the species. Potential hazards include habitat loss, pesticide spraying, and parasitism by shiny cowbirds (Molothrus bonariensis). More studies are needed to understand the effects they have on St. Lucia oriole populations.

References

Saint Lucia Oriole
Saint Lucia Oriole
Endemic birds of the Caribbean
Birds of Saint Lucia
Saint Lucia oriole
Saint Lucia oriole
Taxonomy articles created by Polbot